Anthia fornasinii is a species of ground beetle in the subfamily Anthiinae. It was described by Bertoloni in 1845.

The specific epithet fornasinii is in honour of Italian amateur naturalist Carlo Antonio Fornasini.

References

Anthiinae (beetle)
Beetles described in 1845